The 2023 Lamar Hunt U.S. Open Cup will be the 108th edition of the U.S. Open Cup, a knockout cup competition in American soccer. Orlando City SC are the defending champions. The 2023 field will feature 100 teams, including a modern-era record 72 professional sides.

Schedule

Teams

Professional teams that are majority-owned or controlled by higher-division professional clubs are barred from entering the competition. MLS expansion team St. Louis City SC will enter in the Third Round; their reserve team competed in 2022, advancing to the Third Round. On March 10, 2023, Rochester New York FC announced they would not compete in the 2023 MLS Next Pro season.

Table

 Bold denotes team is still active in the tournament.
  $: Winner of $25,000 bonus for advancing the furthest in the competition from their respective divisions. 
  $$: Winner of $100,000 for being the runner-up in the competition.
  $$$: Winner of $300,000 for winning the competition.

Map

Number of teams by state
A total of 34 states and the District of Columbia are represented by clubs in the U.S. Open Cup this year.

States without a team in the Open Cup: Alaska, Arkansas, Delaware, Hawaii, Idaho, Louisiana, Maine, Mississippi, Montana, New Hampshire, North Dakota, Rhode Island, South Dakota, Vermont, West Virginia, and Wyoming.

Open Cup debuts

21 teams will be playing in their first Open Cup tournament in 2023.

 MLS: St. Louis City SC
 USLC: Loudoun United FC
 NISA: Club de Lyon (D3), Gold Star FC Detroit, Savannah Clovers FC
 USL1: Lexington SC, One Knoxville SC
 NPSL: Appalachian FC, Crossfire Redmond, Jacksonville Armada U-23
 USL2: Lionsbridge FC, Manhattan SC, Nona FC, Project 51O
 UPSL: Beaman United FC, UDA Soccer 
 Other Open Division: Capo FC, Chicago House AC, Club de Lyon (open), Inter San Francisco, West Chester United SC

First and Second rounds

The complete draw for the First round, including match dates and times, was announced on February 3, 2023. 

The draw for the Second round pairings and hosting scenarios was announced on February 16, 2023.

Bracket

Host team listed first
Bold = winner
* = after extra time, = penalty shootout score

First round

All times local to game site.

Second round

All times local to game site.

Broadcasting
Warner Bros. Discovery Sports holds the rights to broadcast the Open Cup from 2023 to 2030, as part of a larger media rights agreement with U.S. Soccer. Select matches from the first three rounds will be broadcast for free on the Bleacher Report app or via the B/R Football YouTube channel.

References

 
U.S. Open Cup
Cup
US Open Cup
U.S. Open Cup